Ben Ohau Range is a mountain range in Canterbury Region, South Island, New Zealand.

The Ben Ohau range is dominated at the southern end by Ben Ohau (1522m). Other mountains in the range include Backbone Peak (2263m), MacKenzies Peak (2200m), Glentanner Peak (2551m) Ferintosh Peak (2497m), Mauka Atua (2557m), Kai Tarau (2542m), and Mt Dark (2496m). At the northern end Mt Cran stands at 2444m, Jamieson Saddle at 2183m and Mt Edgar Thomson at 2379m.

Biodiversity 
The moth species Ichneutica agorastis is particularly common at a string mires found in the Ben Ohau Range.

References

External links 
 Photo of Ben Ohau Range

Mountain ranges of Canterbury, New Zealand